Expiation is appeasing a deity, atonement.

Expiation may also refer to:
 Expiation (film), a silent 1922 British crime film
 "Expiation", an episode of Lewis, a British crime drama TV series — see List of Lewis episodes